Pannonica is a live album by pianist Horace Parlan's trio which was recorded in Munich in 1981 and released on the German Enja label in 1984.

Reception

The AllMusic review by Ron Wynn said "The material, mostly standards with some originals and ballads, isn't overly ambitious, but Parlan's dense, strong blues-influenced solos and good interaction among the three principals keeps things moving".

Track listing
 "No Greater Love" (Isham Jones, Marty Symes) – 5:33
 "Pannonica" (Thelonious Monk) – 6:22
 "C Jam Blues" (Duke Ellington) – 7:02
 "Hi-Fly" (Randy Weston) – 9:18
 "Who Cares?" (George Gershwin, Ira Gershwin) – 9:47

Personnel
Horace Parlan – piano
Reggie Johnson – bass
Alvin Queen – drums

References

Enja Records live albums
Horace Parlan live albums
1984 live albums